François Bouffier (1844–1881) was a French non-commissioned officer of the 19th century, a sergeant of the 8th Battalion of infantrymen. He was a member of the first French Military Mission to Japan in 1867, in which he accompanied Jules Brunet. He worked as an instructor for infantry in the army of the shōgun.

With the advent of the Boshin War, and the declaration of neutrality of foreign powers, Bouffier chose to resign from the French Army and continue the fight on the side of the Bakufu.

He participated to the Battle of Hakodate, in which he was head of one of the four Japanese regiments.

Bouffier chose to remain in Japan, and was buried at the Yokohama International cemetery in 1881. In the same cemetery were buried his two sons, Léon Célestin (1876–1877), and Auguste Louis (1873–1923).

Notes

References
 Polak, Christian. (2001). Soie et lumières: L'âge d'or des échanges franco-japonais (des origines aux années 1950). Tokyo: Chambre de Commerce et d'Industrie Française du Japon, Hachette Fujin Gahōsha (アシェット婦人画報社).
 Polak, Christian. (2002). 絹と光: 知られざる日仏交流100年の歴史 (江戶時代-1950年代) Kinu to hikari: shirarezaru Nichi-Futsu kōryū 100-nen no rekishi (Edo jidai-1950-nendai). Tokyo: Ashetto Fujin Gahōsha, 2002. ;

External links
 Land of fire

French soldiers
Meiji Restoration
1881 deaths
1844 births
People of the Boshin War
French emigrants to Japan